The 24th Biathlon World Championships were held in 1989 in Feistritz, Austria. These world championships were the first to hold the men's and women's championships simultaneously.

Men's results

20 km individual

10 km sprint

Team event

4 × 7.5 km relay

Women's results

15 km individual

This marked the first time that the women's individual event was held over 15 km in the World Championships.

7.5 km sprint

This marked the first time that the women's sprint event was held over 7.5 km in the World Championships.

Team event

3 × 7.5 km relay

Medal table

References

1989
Biathlon World Championships
International sports competitions hosted by Austria
1989 in Austrian sport
February 1989 sports events in Europe
Biathlon competitions in Austria
Sport in Carinthia (state)